Kadhja Bonet (born January 31, 1988, in Los Angeles, California) is an American musician.

Early life
Bonet grew up in Los Angeles, California, as the middle child of seven siblings and studied classical music from an early age, playing the violin. Her father, Allen Bonet, was an opera singer and her mother also a musician. She taught herself guitar and other instruments. The actress Lisa Bonet is her half-sister.

Career
Bonet's debut, the single "Tears for Lamont" was produced by Itai Shapira and released in 2014. Later that year, while participating in the Red Bull Music Academy program in Tokyo, she collaborated on and released "Late Night Munchies."

The mini album The Visitor EP was first self-released in September 2015, then re-released with new bonus tracks under the name The Visitor in October 2016, as a partnership between two independent record labels, Fat Possum Records and Fresh Selects, receiving critical praise and extensive radio air play.

Her second album, Childqueen, written while touring abroad, was released on June 8, 2018.

She has also appeared on albums from other musicians, including Anderson .Paak, SiR, Bonobo, Khruangbin, Free Nationals, and more.

Critical reaction
Bonet's music has been described as psychedelic soul while, for other critics, it "amalgamates folk, jazz and soul," or evokes "Billie Holiday, whisky, and 1940s Disney" in a "genre-defying" way.

Clash magazine wrote that her second album "places Kadhja Bonet in a league of her own." The single "Delphine" from the album was described as "spellbinding" and the album itself as "proof of her idiosyncratic genius."

Discography
Studio albums
 The Visitor (2016)
 Childqueen (2018)

Extended plays
 Childqueen Outtakes (2018)

Singles
 "Remember the Rain" (2015)

 "Delphine" (2018)

Collaborations
 "Plans We Make", Son Lux (from the album Tomorrows III (2021)).
 "We Forgot Love", Nicolas Godin (from the album Concrete and Glass (2021)).

References

External links
Interview by Mary Anne Hobbs (2018)

21st-century American musicians
Living people
Year of birth missing (living people)
Place of birth missing (living people)